The 1923–24 season was the 43rd season in the history of Nelson F.C. and their third as a professional club in the Football League. The team competed in the Second Division of the Football League for the first time, having won promotion as champions of the Third Division North in the previous campaign. Nelson struggled against more established opponents in the higher league, and were relegated at the end of the season, finishing second-bottom of the division just a point behind Fulham, who avoided relegation. Despite achieving a 1–0 victory away against Manchester United, Nelson suffered several heavy defeats during the campaign, including a 0–6 loss to Derby County, and at one point went six matches without scoring a goal. Nelson ended the season on 33 points, with a record of 10 wins, 13 draws and 19 defeats in 42 matches.

Nelson entered the FA Cup in the Fifth Qualifying Round, and were knocked out in a replay at that stage by Wigan Borough, having drawn the original tie. A total of 30 players were used by Nelson throughout their 44 first-team matches. The majority of the championship-winning team remained with Nelson. New signings included defender Jack Newnes, who went on to become a Wales international, Billy Caulfield and Eddie Cameron. With 14 goals in 42 appearances, Joe Eddleston was the team's top goalscorer for the third season in succession, and also played the highest number of matches of all the first-team squad. The highest attendance of the season at the club's Seedhill stadium was 12,000 on two occasions, the first of these the opening day game against Clapton Orient on 26 August 1923. The lowest attendance in the league was 7,000 for three different matches, while the FA Cup replay against Wigan Borough attracted a crowd of only 4,000 spectators.

Background

In the 1922–23 season, Nelson had been crowned champions of the Football League Third Division North after winning 24 of their 38 league fixtures. In May 1923, the club embarked on a pre-season tour of Spain. Six matches were played during the trip, two each against Real Madrid, Racing de Santander and Real Oviedo. On 15 May 1923, Nelson achieved a 4–2 victory against Real Madrid at the Campo de Ciudad Lineal, two of the goals coming from Dick Crawshaw, who had been signed towards the end of the previous campaign. In doing so, Nelson became the first English club to defeat Real Madrid at their home ground.

Football League Second Division

Match results
Key

In Result column, Nelson's score shown first
H = Home match
A = Away match

— = Attendance not known
o.g. = Own goal

Results

Final league position

FA Cup
Match results

Appearances and goals
Key to positions

CF = Centre forward
DF = Defender
FB = Fullback

GK = Goalkeeper
IF = Inside forward
OF = Outside forward

Statistics

See also
List of Nelson F.C. seasons

References
General

Specific

Nelson F.C. seasons
Nelson